Billy Murray may refer to:

 Billy Murray (actor) (born 1941), English actor
 Billy Murray (baseball) (1864–1937), American baseball manager
 Billy Murray (singer) (1877–1954), American singer
 Billy Murray (boxer) (1892–1926), American boxer
 Billy Murray (footballer) (1922–1992), English footballer

See also
 Bill Murray (born 1950), American film actor
 William Murray (disambiguation)